The 2013 Syracuse Orange football team represented Syracuse University in the 2013 NCAA Division I FBS football season. The Orange were led by first year head coach Scott Shafer and played their home games at the Carrier Dome. The season marked their first as members of the Atlantic Coast Conference, after their final season in the Big East Conference in 2012. They finished the season 7–6, 4–4 in ACC play to finish in a tie for third place in the Atlantic Division. They were invited to the Texas Bowl where they defeated Minnesota.

Previous season

The Orange's 2012 season was their last as members of the Big East Conference. They finished the year with an 8–5 record, and finished as conference co-champions, with a 5–2 record in Big East play. The Orange capped off their season with a  win in the 2012 New Era Pinstripe Bowl over long-time rival West Virginia.

Preseason
After the conclusion of the season, head coach Doug Marrone was mentioned by several sportswriters as a possible candidate for a head coaching job in the National Football League. On January 6, 2013, Marrone was introduced as the head coach of the Buffalo Bills. Offensive coordinator Nathaniel Hackett departed for Buffalo as well, leaving a number of coaching positions open. On January 9, Syracuse announced the promotion of defensive coordinator Scott Shafer to head coach. Shortly thereafter, George McDonald was announced as the new offensive coordinator, and Chuck Bullough was announced as the new defensive coordinator.

Personnel

Coaching staff

Schedule

Game summaries

Penn State

  
  
  
  
  
  
  
  

Penn State Leads Series: 43–23–5

The Orange opened their season by traveling to MetLife Stadium in East Rutherford, NJ to renew their rivalry with the Penn State Nittany Lions. This was the 71st all-time meeting between the two schools.

Neither offense could get much going in the first half, and the score stood 6–3 in favor of Penn State at the break. The second half proved to be better for the Lions, as quarterback Christian Hackenberg lead the team to a 23–10 lead early in the 4th quarter. A Jerome Smith touchdown late in the game cut the deficit to 23–17, but the potential Orange comeback fell short when quarterback Drew Allen threw his second interception of the game late in the 4th.

Northwestern

  
  
  
  
  
  
  
  
  
  
  
  

Series Tied: 5–5

For the second consecutive season, the Orange lost to the Northwestern Wildcats of the Big Ten Conference.

Wagner

  
  
  
  
  
  
  
  
  

Syracuse Leads Series: 1–0

The Orange hosted Wagner in their home opener at the Carrier Dome in the first ever meeting between the two universities.

Syracuse's offense put on a dominating performance and rolled to a 54–0 win, their first of the season.

Tulane

  

Syracuse Leads Series: 7–1

Tulane visits the Carrier Dome for the first time since the 1999 season. This is the second meeting in three years between the two teams.

Clemson

  

Syracuse is Tied in Series: 1–1

The Orange's first conference game as members of the Atlantic Coast Conference was a matchup against the 3rd ranked Clemson Tigers. This was the second all-time meeting between Clemson and Syracuse, with the first ending in a 41–0 victory for the Orange in the 1996 Gator Bowl.

Clemson evened the overall series with a 49–14 victory behind a career night by Tajh Boyd who went 20 for 27 for 455 yards and 5 touchdowns.

NC State

  
  
  
  
  
  

NC State Leads Series: 6–1

Syracuse traveled to Raleigh, NC for a game against the NC State Wolfpack.

Georgia Tech

  

Georgia Tech Leads Series: 2–0

Syracuse looked to avenge a 51–14 drubbing at the hands of Georgia Tech in their last meeting, which was the 2004 Champs Sports Bowl.

Wake Forest

  

Series Tied: 1–1

The last meeting between the two schools occurred in the 2011 season, with the Orange winning in a thrilling overtime affair.

Maryland

  

Syracuse Leads Series: 18–14–2

This was the only conference matchup between these two teams, as the Terrapins will be joining the Big Ten Conference for the 2014 season.

Florida State

  

Florida State Leads Series: 5–1

The Orange made their last road trip of the season to take on the Florida State Seminoles. This was their first game as conference opponents.

Pittsburgh

  

Pittsburgh Leads Series: 34–31–3

The Orange hosted familiar rival Pittsburgh in their first meeting as members of the Atlantic Coast Conference. This matchup was designated as a protected inter-division crossover game that will be played annually.

Boston College

  

Syracuse Leads Series: 28–18

Formerly Big East Conference rivals, Syracuse and Boston College played their first game as conference opponents to close out the regular season. The 2013 edition was a must-win for the Orange in order to be bowl-eligible.

References

Syracuse
Syracuse Orange football seasons
Texas Bowl champion seasons
Syracuse Orange football